Algebraist may refer to:
a specialist in algebra.
 The Algebraist, a science fiction novel by Iain M. Banks.